The list of Karnataka Rajyotsava Award recipients for the year 2013 is below.

List of awardees

References

Rajyotsava Award
Recipients of the Rajyotsava Award 2013